Yungang Subdistrict is one of the fourteen subdistricts of Fengtai District, Beijing, China. It is located on the southwest of Fengtai, and borders Changxindian Town to the northeast, as well as Wangzuo Town to the southwest. It had a population of 34,537 in 2020.

History

Administrative Division 
At the end of 2021, there were a total of 12 subdivisions within the subdistrict, with 11 communities and 1 village:

See also 

 List of township-level divisions of Beijing

References 

Fengtai District
Subdistricts of Beijing